This is a list of cycling tracks and velodromes for track cycling worldwide.

Velodromes currently in use 
Indoor: all the structures are closed inside
Outdoor: the velodrome is uncovered and in open air.
Outdoor, fully covered: all the structures are covered but in open air.
Outdoor, track covered: the track is covered but in open air.

Velodromes no longer in use

List of oldest cycling tracks and velodromes 

This list exposes the oldest tracks around the world that are still existing today.

The Andreasried Velodrome (Erfurt, Germany) was originally built in 1885 but was entirely redeveloped in 2006–2007. This one is in fact a new track.

References

Cycling tracks and velodromes